Bradley Dean King is an American film director and screenwriter. He made his directorial debut with Time Lapse (2014).

Early life
King was raised in Los Alamos, New Mexico. He attended the Art Institute of Colorado and the Colorado Film School.

Career
King began his career in 2004 when he wrote and directed Action Figures.

Films
Time Lapse (2014)
Requiem (2012)
Drive Time (2011)
Action Figures (2004)

References

External links
http://www.imdb.com/name/nm1783713/

Film directors from New Mexico
American male screenwriters
Living people
Year of birth missing (living people)
People from Los Alamos, New Mexico
Screenwriters from New Mexico